Sim is a rural locality (a settlement) in Solikamsky District of Perm Krai, Russia.

References

Rural localities in Solikamsky District